Melbourne Composers is an Australian television series which aired 1961-1962(?) on ABC. It interviewed Melbourne composers, whose works were featured in the series.

References

External links
Melbourne Composers on IMDb

1961 Australian television series debuts
Australian non-fiction television series
Black-and-white Australian television shows
Australian Broadcasting Corporation original programming